Cărbunari may refer to:

 Cărbunari, a commune in Caraş-Severin County, Romania
 Cărbunari, a village in Grajduri Commune, Iaşi County, Romania
 Cărbunari, a village in Dumbrăviţa Commune, Maramureș County, Romania
 Cărbunari, a village in Poienarii Burchii Commune, Prahova County, Romania